The Hills Have Eyes is a 2006 horror film directed by Alexandre Aja and co-written by Aja and Grégory Levasseur, in their English-language debut. It is a remake of Wes Craven's 1977 film of the same name. The film stars Aaron Stanford, Kathleen Quinlan, Vinessa Shaw, Emilie de Ravin, Dan Byrd, Robert Joy, and Ted Levine and follows a family that is targeted by a group of cannibalistic mutants after their car breaks down in the desert.

The Hills Have Eyes was released theatrically in the United States and United Kingdom on March 10, 2006. It earned $15.5 million in its opening weekend in the U.S., where it was originally rated NC-17 for strong gruesome violence, but was later edited down to an R-rating. An unrated DVD version was released on June 20, 2006.

Plot
Retired detective Bob Carter and his wife Ethel are travelling from Cleveland to San Diego through the New Mexico desert for their silver wedding anniversary; with them are their three children, Lynn, Brenda, and Bobby, Lynn's husband Doug and their baby daughter Catherine, and their two German Shepherds, Beauty and Beast. They stop at a gas station where the elderly attendant suggests a different route through the hills, claiming it will save them a few hours. Not long after, their tires are punctured by a hidden spike strip, causing the truck and trailer to crash.

Bob and Doug set off in opposite directions to find help while the rest of the family stay by the trailer. Beauty escapes and, when Bobby chases her into the hills, he finds her mutilated corpse. Horrified, he flees back to the trailer but falls off the hill on the way, knocking himself unconscious. A timid female mutant Ruby protects him from her brother Goggle. Meanwhile, Bob arrives back at the gas station. Upon searching the station, he finds newspaper clippings detailing various disappearances in the area after recent nuclear testings at a mining town by the US government that caused the mutants' deformities. He confronts the attendant who then commits suicide. Bob attempts to flee in an abandoned car but is attacked by the mutant leader Papa Jupiter.

After Bobby is found by Brenda, Doug returns after heading towards the interstate and found a huge crater filled with numerous abandoned cars and other belongings. When being pursued by Papa Jupiter, Bobby confesses his story to Doug and Lynn, just as Pluto and Lizard infiltrate the trailer. They attack and rape Brenda, who has stayed in the trailer with Catherine, while using a distraction of immolating Bob to a tree to divert the others. When Lynn and Ethel return to the trailer, Lizard shoots both of them before abducting Catherine and escaping with Pluto. Doug and Bobby return to discover the carnage; Lynn and Ethel die shortly afterwards.

The next morning, Doug, along with Beast, set out to rescue Catherine. He comes across an abandoned nuclear testing village through the miner town's cave system but is knocked unconscious by Big Mama. Awakening in an ice box, he escapes and encounters Big Brain who reveals the mutants' origins to him. Pluto appears and attacks Doug but he manages to gain the upper hand and kills Pluto with his own axe before killing another mutant, Cyst. After ordering Lizard to kill Catherine, Big Brain is mauled to death by Beast. Ruby manages to take the baby from Lizard and escapes through the hills.

Back at the trailer, Brenda and Bobby build an explosive trap, which they set off when Brenda is attacked by Jupiter. Meanwhile, Doug catches up with Ruby but Lizard attacks them before Ruby can hand Catherine over. A struggle ensues and Doug manages to defeat him with Cyst's shotgun. Ruby then gives Doug his daughter back. Lizard, still alive, aims the shotgun at Doug but Ruby tackles Lizard off a cliff, sending them both falling to their deaths.

Bobby and Brenda find Jupiter wounded from their trap and Brenda finishes him off with a pickaxe before the siblings are reunited with Doug, Catherine, and Beast. As the survivors of the Carter family embrace, an unknown mutant watches them from afar through binoculars.

Cast

 Aaron Stanford as Doug Bukowski
 Kathleen Quinlan as Ethel Carter
 Vinessa Shaw as Lynn Carter-Bukowski
 Emilie de Ravin as Brenda Carter
 Dan Byrd as Bobby Carter
 Tom Bower as Gas Station Attendant
 Billy Drago as Papa Jupiter
 Robert Joy as Lizard
 Ted Levine as Big Bob Carter
 Desmond Askew as Big Brain
 Ezra Buzzington as Goggle
 Michael Bailey Smith as Pluto
 Laura Ortiz as Ruby
 Maisie Camilleri Preziosi as Catherine Bukowski
 Gregory Nicotero as Cyst
 Ivana Turchetto as Big Mama
 Judith Jane Vallette as Venus
 Adam Perrell as Mercury

Production
An international co-production film between the United States, France and Morocco. Wes Craven, director and writer of The Hills Have Eyes (1977), considered a remake after he saw the success of other horror remakes such as The Texas Chainsaw Massacre (2003) and The Amityville Horror (2005). The search then began for filmmakers to helm the project. Marianne Maddalena, Craven's long-time producing partner, came across Alexandre Aja and his art director/collaborator Grégory Levasseur who had previously made the French slasher film High Tension (2003). After showing the film to Craven and the rest of the production crew, they were impressed with the pair. Craven commented that they "demonstrated a multi-faceted understanding of what is profoundly terrifying" and "After viewing the film and then meeting the film makers, I knew I wanted to work with them." Aja and Levasseur then began to re-write the story in what was the pair's first American production. Initially the remake was setup at Dimension Films as part of Craven's overall deal with Miramax, Dimension then put the film into turnaround where it was acquired by Fox Searchlight.

Director Aja and art director Grégory Levasseur chose not to film in the original's filming location of Victorville, California, and instead scouted many locations for filming including Namibia, South Africa, New Mexico, and Mexico. The two settled on Ouarzazate in Morocco, which was also known as "the gateway to the Sahara Desert".

The film is set in New Mexico, and strongly implies that a large number of atmospheric nuclear weapon tests were performed in that state. In fact, the only atmospheric nuclear detonation in New Mexico was the Trinity test, the first test of a nuclear device conducted on July 16, 1945. The United States carried out most of its atmospheric nuclear weapons tests at the Nevada Test Site and in the Marshall Islands at the lagoons of Bikini and Eniwetok, between 1946 and 1962. The theatrical poster shows Vinessa Shaw's character prone, with a mutant hand on her face.

During the opening sequence, flashes of deformed children are shown. These children are victims of Agent Orange infamous for its use during the Vietnam War.

Effects
Prior to filming, Aja and Levasseur had already conceived an idea for the mutants' appearance. "We based all our descriptions and directions on real documents, pictures and footage that we found on the effects of nuclear fallout in Chernobyl and Hiroshima", explains Aja. 

The Hills Have Eyes utilized the K.N.B. EFX Group Inc., who spent over six months designing the mutants, first using 3D designer tools, such as ZBrush, allowing them to use a computer to generate their sculptures. After prosthetics were made, they could be fitted to the actors before filming. Robert Joy, who plays the mutant Lizard, explained, "Every day, these amazing artists took more than three hours to transform me into something that could only be found in a nightmare." K.N.B. artist Gregory Nicotero was also made a cameo as Cyst, the mutant with the halo headgear.

Jamison Goei and his team, had done over 130 visual effects for the film. A large part of that was digitally constructing the testing village, which in actuality was only one built street with others digitally added. The team also warped the mutant's faces slightly, which is shown mostly in the character of Ruby.

Papa Jupiter displays no deformities. However, as shown in "The Making Of", Papa Jupiter appears to have a large parasitic twin attached to his upper left torso. The young children of the film had their deformities added by CGI, with the exception of Ruby, who had a combination of CGI and makeup.

Casting
The casting process began with the selection of Ted Levine as the character Big Bob. Levine was also a fan of the film High Tension. Afterward, Kathleen Quinlan was cast as Ethel in her first lead role in a horror film, although appeared in the horror films Twilight Zone: The Movie (1983) and Event Horizon (1997). Next, Aaron Stanford was cast as Doug Bukowski who "undergoes the most radical transformation of anyone in the Carter family". Stanford even asked not to see any of the mutants in make-up before his character's battle in the testing village so, that way, he'd be truly frightened. When casting Lynn, Doug's wife, Aja wanted to cast Vinessa Shaw who he had wanted to work with since seeing her in Eyes Wide Shut (1999). Shaw was hesitant to play the role, but after watching High Tension, she agreed, explaining: "There was such an odd combination of beauty and terror, it felt almost like an art film. So, after meeting with Alex and Greg, I decided to do it." For the role of Brenda, the filmmakers sought a young actress who had relatively little exposure and found it in Emilie de Ravin, who was beginning her rise in the television series Lost. After de Ravin, Dan Byrd was cast as Bobby.

Aja then had the six actors arrive in the filming location of Morocco early to bond together.

When casting for the mutants, associate producer Cody Zwieg explained: "We needed to find actors who could not only perform the stunt work, handle the extensive makeup and perform in that makeup, but who truly could embody the fierce, primal nature of the mutants' way of life." To play the role of Pluto, Aja looked to Michael Bailey Smith. For Lizard, the filmmakers cast Robert Joy. Ezra Buzzington, impressed with the filmmakers, agreed to play the role of Goggle and even watched a documentary about human cultures engaging in cannibalism. To play the mutant leader, Billy Drago was cast. The most difficult mutant to cast was Ruby, who was a "touch of sweetness to the madness of the mutants." Laura Ortiz was ultimately cast, making her film debut.

Soundtrack

The soundtrack score was composed by tomandandy. The record was released on March 7, 2006, via Lakeshore Records label.

Track listing

US edition
Tracks 10 to 29 are all original music composed by tomandandy

 Leave the Broken Hearts – The Finalist
 Blue Eyes Woman – The Go
 Highway Kind – Moot Davis
 Summers Gonna Be My Girl – The Go
 More and More – Webb Pierce
 The Walls – Vault
 In the Valley of the Sun – Buddy Stuart
 Daisy – Wires on Fire
 California Dreamin' – The Mamas & the Papas
 Forbidden Zone
 Gas Haven
 Out House
 Praying
 Beauty
 Ravens
 Daddy Daddy
 Beast Finds Beauty
 Trailer
 Aftermath
 Ethel's Death
 Next Morning
 Mine
 Village Test
 Breakfast Time
 Play with Us
 The Quest I
 The Quest II
 Sacrifice
 It's Over?

Release

Box office
The Hills Have Eyes was a commercial success, playing in total 2,521 theaters and taking in its opening weekend $15,708,512. The film grossed $41,778,863 in the United States box office and $70,000,000 worldwide, surpassing its budget costs by over fourfold.

The film placed third at the box office during its opening week. It dropped to fifth after its second week of release, and to eighth after its third week. It fell out of the top 10 into twelfth place after four weeks in release. After five weeks, it placed seventeenth at the box office, and it fell out of the top 20 into twenty-first place after its sixth week. It continued to fall in subsequent weeks.

The Hills Have Eyes was in first release for a total of 105 days, or 15 weeks, with its final showing on June 22, 2006.

Critical reception
Reviews were mixed, with an average critic "Rotten" rating of 52% on Rotten Tomatoes based on 142 reviews. The critical consensus stated "Faster paced for today's audiences, this 'Hills' remake ratchets up the gore for the hardcore horror fans, but will turn away casual audiences." The Washington Post said: "this remake of the alleged 1977 Wes Craven classic has one very disturbing quality: It's too damned good." Some have gone on to refer to the film as torture porn. Bloody Disgusting, however, was scathing of those who referred to the movie's genre as such, saying "some may call it 'Torture porn'—these people are idiots". Roger Ebert also gave a negative review, mentioning that the characters in the film are not familiar with horror movies, and went on to cite that the film should have focused more on the characters rather than the violence, saying "The Hills Have Eyes finds an intriguing setting in 'typical' fake towns built by the government [...] But its mutants are simply engines of destruction. There is a misshapen creature who coordinates attacks with a walkie-talkie; I would have liked to know more about him, but no luck."

Sequel

A sequel, The Hills Have Eyes 2, was released in theaters on March 23, 2007 by Fox Atomic.

References

External links

Interview with director Alexandre Aja at www.sci-fi-online.com

2006 films
2006 horror films
2000s horror thriller films
2000s monster movies
American horror thriller films
American monster movies
French horror films
French horror thriller films
Moroccan horror films
2000s English-language films
Films directed by Alexandre Aja
Adaptations of works by Wes Craven
Remakes of American films
Horror film remakes
Films set in ghost towns
Films set in New Mexico
Films shot in Morocco
Films scored by Tomandandy
Mannequins in films
Fox Searchlight Pictures films
American serial killer films
American rape and revenge films
Films about cannibalism
The Hills Have Eyes
Films about families
Films about vacationing
Films set in deserts
2000s American films
Films about mutants